Robert de Lindsay, Lord of Locherwood, was a 12th-century Scottish noble.

Robert was a son of Walter de Lindsay. His elder brother was William de Lindsay, Lord of Ercildum, Crawford, Baron of Luffness and Justiciar of Lothian. Not much is known of Richard. The lands of Locherwood were passed by his great-granddaughter Margaret, heiress of Locherwood to the Hay family.

References
Douglas, Robert. The Peerage of Scotland, containing an Historical and Genealogical Account of the Nobility of that Kingdom from their origin to the present generation; collected from the public records and ancient chartularies of this nation, the charters and other writings, and the works of our best historians. 1764.

12th-century Scottish people
Medieval Scottish knights
Richard